The Janeth Jepkosgei Shoe4Africa School was officially opened on December 23, 2011 (see newscast on KTN News LINK). The school was formally registered with the Nandi District Office in Kapsabet and replaces an old school, built on neighboring land, formerly named as Kapsumbeiyo Primary School.

The school was funded by Shoe4Africa to honor the world track and field 800m champion, and Olympic Silver medallist, Janeth Jepkosgei who had attended the former school in the 1990s. The school is a public primary, with eight classes from standard one to eight, thus was given to the community and the Kenyan Government as a gift from Shoe4Africa. The school is now run by an eight-person school management committee that is chaired by a former head teacher of the now-defunct Kapsumbeiyo school.

Within days of opening, on January 3, 2012, the school had grown by 20% to 288 pupils (141 girls, 147 boys).

See also

 Education in Kenya
 List of schools in Kenya

2011 establishments in Kenya
Buildings and structures in Rift Valley Province
Education in Rift Valley Province
Educational institutions established in 2011
Nandi County
Elementary and primary schools in Kenya